The  is an Asian American civil rights charity, headquartered in San Francisco, with regional chapters across the United States.

The Japanese American Citizens League (JACL) describes itself as the oldest and largest Asian American civil rights organization in the United States, focusing on civil and human rights of all Americans, particularly the Asian Pacific American community. The organization was formed in 1929 out of existing Nisei organizations in California and Washington.

In its early years, the JACL lobbied for legislation that expanded the citizenship rights of Japanese Americans, and local chapters organized meetings to encourage Nisei to become more politically active. During and leading up to World War II, the JACL was criticized for its decision not to use its political influence to fight the incarceration of Japanese Americans, aiding U.S. intelligence agencies in identifying "disloyal" Issei, and taking a hardline stance against draft resisters in camp. These issues remain a source of division within the Japanese American community and the organization itself.

After the war, the JACL returned its primary focus to civil rights legislation, lobbying Congress and bringing lawsuits to overturn or amend laws regarding interracial marriage, segregation, and race-based restrictions on immigration and naturalization. In the 1970s, after some initial disagreement among leaders, the organization became involved in the movement for redress for the wartime incarceration. The influence of JACL lobbyists was a key factor in the passage of the Civil Liberties Act of 1988, which formally acknowledged the unconstitutionality of and provided reparations for the incarceration. A younger generation of JACL leadership has made an effort to acknowledge the consequences of its wartime actions, officially apologizing for its condemnation of Nisei draft resisters in 2002.

Today, the national organization consists of 100-plus chapters, mostly located in major cities and metropolitan areas across the US. These chapters are separated geographically into seven district councils, each of which is headed by a district governor. The organization is guided by a board of elected officials, consisting of the officers and district governors. As demographic and political shifts changed the face of the Japanese American community since 2000, the JACL expanded its mission to protect the rights of other Asian Pacific Americans and people of all ethnic groups, and to focus on issues important to the hapa identities of younger, mixed-race members.

In 1994, the JACL became the first non-LGBTQ organization after the ACLU to support marriage equality.

History

Early years (1929–1941)
In 1929, several already-established Nisei organizations merged to form the Japanese American Citizens League (JACL), most prominent among them Fresno's American Loyalty League (headed by Nisei UC educated dentist Dr. Thomas T. Yatabe, 1897-1977), the Seattle Progressive Citizens League, and the San Francisco-based New American Citizens League (headed by Nisei UC educated lawyer , 1902-1977). Aiming towards professionals and small business owners among the Nisei, the JACL sought to promote free enterprise, self-reliance, and loyalty to the United States. The organization thus excluded a hyphen from its name.

Due in part to the active support of James Sakamoto and other Seattle activists, the nascent JACL chose to hold its first national conference in Seattle in 1930. It soon after began work to expand the citizenship rights of Japanese and other Asian Americans, who were considered unassimilable to American society and therefore ineligible for naturalization under the Immigration Act of 1924. Their first target was the Cable Act of 1922, which revoked the citizenship of women who married men ineligible for citizenship, namely Asian immigrants. After a successful lobbying campaign, Congress amended the act in 1931. Next, the JACL began a campaign to allow Issei and other Asian American veterans of the First World War to become U.S. citizens. In 1935, the Nye-Lea Act secured citizenship rights for these men.

World War II incarceration (1941–1945)

Within hours of the Imperial Japanese Navy's attack on Pearl Harbor, the Federal Bureau of Investigation (FBI) began arresting Japanese American community leaders (mostly Issei Japanese language school teachers, priests, martial arts instructors, and business owners). 

Members of the JACL testified at government hearings to promote an image of Nisei as loyal and patriotic Americans, an effort to counteract rumors of fifth column activity that had spread in the wake of Pearl Harbor. At the same time, the JACL aided FBI and Naval Intelligence officials to identify potentially disloyal Issei, a move many Japanese Americans argued tried to buy political safety for a small segment of the community at the expense of its more vulnerable members.

When President Franklin D. Roosevelt signed Executive Order 9066, JACL leadership did not question the constitutionality of the exclusion of Japanese Americans from the West Coast. Instead, arguing it would better serve the community to follow government orders without protest, the organization advised the approximately 120,000 affected to go peacefully and distanced itself from those who actively opposed the order. In an interview after the war, civil rights attorney Wayne M. Collins criticized these actions of the JACL. "The JACL pretended to be the spokesman for all Japanese Americans, but they wouldn't stand up for their people ... They led their people like a bunch of goddam doves to the concentration camps."

Throughout the war, the JACL made efforts to ensure some measure of protection and comfort for Japanese Americans resettling outside government concentration camps, providing loans and establishing offices in Chicago to assist families resettling in the Midwest. The organization argued for the right of Japanese Americans to serve in the U.S. military. In Hawaii where at that time the JACL did not exist, many community leaders actively supported for men of Japanese descent to serve in the military resulting in the formation of the 100th Infantry Battalion in June 1942  and then the 442nd RCT in January 1943 when 10,000 signed up with eventually 2,686 being chosen to join the 1,500 from the mainland.

Redress (1945–1988)

Following the war, the JACL began a long series of legislative efforts to establish rights for Japanese Americans. The JACL embarked on a hard-fought campaign to repeal California's Alien Land Law, which had prohibited all Japanese aliens (i.e. immigrants) from purchasing and owning land in the state. In 1948, the JACL succeeded in gaining passage of the Evacuation Claims Act, the first of a series of efforts to rectify the losses and injustices of the World War II incarceration. In 1949, the JACL initiated efforts in the U.S. Congress to gain the right of Japanese immigrants to become naturalized citizens of the U.S..

In 1970, the JACL endorsed a resolution, introduced by member Edison Uno, to urge Congress to compensate each camp survivor for each day they had spent in confinement.  Later, in 1979, the JACL's National Committee for Redress proposed the creation of a federal commission to investigate the incarceration.  

The following year, the JACL, with help from Senators Daniel Inouye and Spark Matsunaga, pushed a bill through Congress to create the Commission on Wartime Relocation and Internment of Civilians (CWRIC). In 1983, the CWRIC published its findings and recommended an official Government apology and redress payments to survivors. This was granted with the passage of the Civil Liberties Act of 1988 and signed by President Ronald Reagan.

Post-redress (1988–present)
In 1994, at its national convention, the JACL passed a resolution affirming its commitment to and support of the basic human right of marriage, including the right to marry for same-sex couples.  The JACL was the first national civil rights membership organization to publicly and actively adopt this position, and it has continued to be in the forefront, advocating rights for same-sex marriage.

Programs

Bridging Communities Program
The Bridging Communities Program brings youth from the Japanese and Asian American community together with Muslim and Arab American youth. High school students attend workshops on identity, community, organizing, culture, and empowerment. The program involves visits to the Tule Lake Relocation Center, Manzanar, and Minidoka National Historic Site concentration camps, which first confined Japanese Americans during World War II. The Bridging Communities program is funded by a grant from the National Park Service.

Organizational partners include the Council on American-Islamic Relations, the Tule Lake Pilgrimage Committee, the National Japanese American Historical Society, Nikkei for Civil Rights and Redress, Kizuna, and Friends of Minidoka.

JACL/OCA Leadership Summit
This three-day annual leadership training summit is a joint program organized by the JACL which includes participants from OCA National (formerly the Organization of Chinese Americans), the second largest Asian Pacific American civil rights organizations in the United States. Workshop topics range from coalition building techniques to the strategy of successful lobbying.

Youth Leadership Summit
The JACL's Youth Leadership Summit was first established in 2010 and has been held annually in Chicago, Portland, and Washington DC.

Collegiate Leadership Conference
Held every year, the Collegiate Leadership Conference was established in 2009 and is patterned after the JACL/OCA Washington, DC Leadership Conference. The conference consists of a three-day program connecting Asian American student leaders from around the country with community leaders and elected officials in Washington DC. The event is limited to Asian American college students who are in their freshman, sophomore or junior year in school.

Scholarships
The JACL launched a National Scholarship and Awards Program in 1946.  The program currently offers over 30 awards, with an annual total of over $70,000 in scholarships to qualified students nationwide.

The National Scholarship and Awards Program offer scholarships to students at the entering freshman, undergraduate, graduate, law, financial need and creative & performing arts. All scholarships are one-time awards.

National Convention

History of National Convention
The first JACL National Convention was held on August 29, 1930, in Seattle, Washington. The first post World War II National JACL Convention was held in Denver, Colorado. Adoption of a 14-point program of rebuilding which included Issei naturalization, reparations for discriminatory treatment during the war, re-examination of the constitutionality of the evacuation, stay of deportation on hardship cases involving Japanese nationals, a call for a national conference of minorities, elimination of racial discrimination in housing and employment, challenge of the alien land laws, creation of a research clearinghouse on the evacuation, and assistance of returning Nisei veterans.

1970 National Convention
The 1970 JACL convention was marred by the murder of Evelyn Okubo, an 18-year-old activist and attendee, by a black man. Nevertheless, the JACL continued its commitment to racial justice for all Americans, including African-Americans.

2013 National Convention
The 2013 JACL National Convention was held July 24–26, 2013, in Washington, DC. The theme for the 44th convention was "Justice for All".

Headquarters, districts and chapters 
As of 2022, the JACL is headquartered in San Francisco's Japantown neighborhood, directly neighboring the offices of the Japanese American Association of Northern California (Hokka Nichi Bei Kai /北加日米会), which describes itself as the oldest Japanese American Community organization (founded in 1895).

The JACL also maintains an office in Washington DC, and (as of 2022) has over 100 chapters in the US, organized into seven district counciles: Central California District Council, Eastern District Council, Intermountain District Council, Midwest District Council, Northern California-Western Nevada-Pacific District Council, Pacific Northern District Council, and Pacific Southwest District Council.

The JACL did not exist in Hawaii during the years prior to and after World War II; a chapter was finally established in 1980.

Notable members

Frank Chuman
Gordon Hirabayashi
Mike Honda
Chris Iijima

Mike Masaoka
Doris Matsui
Robert Matsui
Spark Matsunaga
Stan Matsunaka
Norman Mineta
Evelyn Okubo
James Y. Sakamoto
Charles Z. Smith
George Takei
Grayce Uyehara
George Yuzawa

See also

 Pacific Citizen
 Japanese Americans
 Densho: The Japanese American Legacy Project
 Japanese American Committee for Democracy
 Japanese American National Library
 Japanese American National Museum
Japanese American Museum of San Jose
 Japan–United States relations
 Anti-Japanese sentiment in the United States
 Consulate-General of Japan, San Francisco
 U.S.-Japan Council

References

Further reading
 Bill Hosokawa, JACL in Quest of Justice (Morrow, 1982).

External links

 Website for national organization
 Berkeley chapter
 New England chapter
 Portland, Oregon chapter
 Twin Cities chapter
 New York chapter

Japanese American
Internment of Japanese Americans
Asian-American organizations
Non-profit organizations based in California
Organizations established in 1929